Ma Dehua (born 11 August 1945) is a Chinese actor best known for his role as Zhu Bajie in the 1986 television series Journey to the West.

Life
Ma was born in a family of merchants in Beijing on August 11, 1945, with his ancestral home in Wucheng County, Shandong, he is of Hui people ethnicity, he is the third child of four children.

Ma aspired to act from an early age. At the age of 5, Ma started to studied Chinese martial arts.

Ma studied at the High School Affiliated to Minzu University of China. Ma entered the China National Peking Opera Company by age 14, he learned Kunqu opera and Beijing opera there. After finished, Ma worked in the Northern Kunqu Opera Theater as an actor.

During the Cultural Revolution, Ma acted in Shajiabang, Taking Tiger Mountain by Strategy and Dujuan Mountain.

In early 1982, Director Yang Jie invited Ma to act Zhu Bajie in Journey to the West, by the age of 37. The series was one of the most watched ones in mainland China in that year.

Ma retired in 1999, at the age of 54.

In 2007, Ma starred opposite Liu Xiao Ling Tong, Chi Zhongrui, Liu Dagang in Wu Cheng'en and Journey to the West.

Personal life
Ma married worker Hou Yumin in October 1972, they have a son, Ma Yang (born 1973).

Filmography

Film

Television

References

External links

1957 births
Male actors from Beijing
Living people
Chinese male television actors
Male Kunqu actors
Singers from Beijing
20th-century Chinese male actors
20th-century Chinese  male singers
Chou actors
Hui male actors
Hui singers